

1979

External links
 Soviet films of 1979 at the Internet Movie Database

1979
Soviet
Films